WVEN-TV (channel 43) is a television station licensed to Melbourne, Florida, United States, broadcasting the Spanish-language Univision network to the Orlando area. It is owned and operated by TelevisaUnivision alongside low-power, Class A UniMás outlet WRCF-CD (channel 29). Both stations share studios on Douglas Avenue in Altamonte Springs, while WVEN-TV's transmitter is located in unincorporated Bithlo, Florida.

History

The station was assigned on February 9, 1987 with the call sign of WLSY. On December 10 of that year, the call sign was changed to WAYQ. In 1988, Beach TV Partners signed on WAYQ at channel 26 as a simulcast of Melbourne's WAYK, giving them a signal in Daytona Beach. In early August 1990, owner Beach Television Partners based in Vero Beach filed for Chapter 11 reorganization over an inability to renegotiation loan payment schedule. At the time, the station was only carried part-time on CableVision of Central Florida, Orlando's major cable system. WAYK was affiliated with the Beach TV investor, Harry Handley, who founded the Star Television Network. The network launched in September 1990 only to close down on January 14, 1991.

In 1992, WAYK and WAYQ were both sold to Robert Rich, who changed their format to feature more paid programming.

WVEN

In 1996, the two stations were split up with Paxson Communications acquiring WIRB (whose call letters would be changed to the present day WOPX-TV), while WNTO was purchased by Entravision Communications. On , WVEN became the station's call sign and the station also affiliated with Univision.

On December 4, 2017, as part of a channel swap made by Entravision Communications, WVEN and sister station WOTF swapped channel numbers, with WVEN moving from digital channel 49 and virtual channel 26 to digital and virtual channel 43.

On October 13, 2021, Univision announced it would take over operation of WVEN and WOTF, as well as Tampa Bay Univision affiliate WVEA-TV, effective January 1, 2022, coinciding with the end of licensing agreements on December 31, 2021.

News operation
WVEN produces evening newscasts at 6 and 11 p.m. newscast under the Noticias Univision Florida Central (formerly Noticias Univision Orlando until 2010), along with local news updates that are broadcast on weekday mornings during Univision's morning news program Despierta América under the title Despierta Orlando. WVEN previously partnered with now-former sister radio station WNUE-FM (which has since been sold to Radio Training Network in mid-2021, now airing a non-commercial Christian AC format), which provided them with news briefs and breaking news events as they warranted.

Technical information

Subchannels
The station's digital signal is multiplexed:

Analog-to-digital conversion
WVEN-TV ended programming on its analog signal, on UHF channel 26, on June 12, 2009, as part of the federally mandated transition from analog to digital television. The station's digital signal continued to broadcast on its pre-transition UHF channel 49. Through the use of PSIP, digital television receivers display the station's virtual channel as its former UHF analog channel 26.

References

External links

VEN-TV
VEN-TV
Univision network affiliates
GetTV affiliates
Bounce TV affiliates
Ion Mystery affiliates
Quest (American TV network) affiliates
Television channels and stations established in 1988
1988 establishments in Florida
Melbourne, Florida